The Museum of Medicine is a medical museum in Seoul, South Korea.

External links 
 Official site

See also 
 List of museums in South Korea

Museums in Seoul
Medical museums
Science museums in South Korea
Medical and health organizations based in South Korea